This list gives an overview of motte-and-bailey castles in Belgium with a motte that is still visible and that hasn't been completely levelled or disappeared. This list is not exhaustive.